Salem is a town in Rockingham County, New Hampshire, United States. The population was 30,089 at the 2020 census. Being located on Interstate 93 as the first town in New Hampshire, which lacks any state sales tax, Salem has grown into a commercial hub, anchored by the Mall at Rockingham Park. Other major sites include Canobie Lake Park, a large amusement park; and America's Stonehenge, a stone structure of disputed origins. It is the former home of Rockingham Park, a horse racetrack. The Sununu political family hails from Salem, including former New Hampshire governor and White House Chief of Staff John H. Sununu, and his sons John E. Sununu, a former U.S. senator, and Chris Sununu, current New Hampshire governor.

Salem was named on Money magazine's "Best Places to Live 2020" list.

History 

The area was first settled in 1652. As early as 1736, Salem was the "North Parish" of Methuen, Massachusetts, or "Methuen District". In 1741, when the boundary line between Massachusetts and New Hampshire was fixed, the "North Parish" became part of New Hampshire, and was given the name "Salem", taken from nearby Salem, Massachusetts. The town was incorporated in 1750 by colonial governor Benning Wentworth. The meetinghouse of the old north parish, erected in 1738, still stands, eventually becoming the town hall of Salem before it was turned into the Salem Historical Society museum.

In 1902, Canobie Lake Park was established in Salem by the Massachusetts Northeast Street Railway Company, to encourage leisure excursions on its trolleys. The plan was successful, and the enterprise quickly became one of the leading resorts of its type in New England. Crowds arrived from all over, including the nearby mill towns of Haverhill, Lawrence, Lowell and Methuen in Massachusetts, and Manchester and Nashua in New Hampshire. Factory workers and others found respite strolling along tree-lined promenades, between flower-beds or beside the lake. Rides, arcades and a dance hall provided lively entertainments. The rise of the automobile, however, brought the decline of the trolley. But Canobie Lake Park, one of the few former street railway amusement resorts still in existence, continues to be popular.

Other features of Salem's tourism history include America's Stonehenge, a curiosity (formerly "Mystery Hill"). A recent attraction in town is the Icenter, a skating arena.

Starting in the 1950s, Salem developed rapidly as part of Greater Boston, with suburban-style residential neighborhoods and a long strip of commercial development along NH Route 28. Commercial construction has continued to focus on Route 28, as well as on the commercial zone off Exit 2 on Interstate 93. Starting in 2017, the Tuscan Village complex has been under construction, a multi-million dollar mixed-use commercial property that includes retail, medical offices, condos and apartments. The complex is being built on the site of the former Rockingham Park race track.

The Manchester and Lawrence branch of the Boston and Maine Railroad ran through Salem until 2001. In 2009, the New Hampshire Department of Transportation commissioned a study exploring reactivation of the branch and instituting commuter rail service connecting to the MBTA Haverhill Line and onward to Boston. The study's cost/benefit analysis recommended taking no action to reactivate beyond preserving the option for consideration at a future time.

Government

Salem's town government consists of a board of selectmen and a town manager. Salem is a part of New Hampshire House District 8 and has nine Republican representatives. In the New Hampshire Senate, Salem is in the 22nd District and is currently represented by Republican Daryl Abbas. On the New Hampshire Executive Council, Salem is in District 3 and is currently represented by Republican Janet Stevens. In the U.S. House of Representatives, Salem is in New Hampshire's 2nd congressional district and is currently represented by Democrat Ann McLane Kuster. 

Salem is a Republican stronghold in presidential elections. No Democratic presidential nominee has carried the town since Bill Clinton received a plurality of the vote in 1996.

Geography

Salem is drained by the Spicket River and its tributary Policy Brook, part of the Merrimack River watershed. Canobie Lake is on the western boundary, Arlington Mill Reservoir is in the north, and World End Pond is in the southeast. None of the town's residential water supply incorporates sodium fluoride, a water additive that helps ensure strong teeth enamel.

Salem is the first New Hampshire town encountered when traveling north from Massachusetts on Interstate 93. The interstate's first two New Hampshire exits are within town.

Adjacent municipalities
 Derry, New Hampshire (north)
 Atkinson, New Hampshire (northeast)
 Haverhill, Massachusetts (east)
 Methuen, Massachusetts (south)
 Pelham, New Hampshire (southwest)
 Windham, New Hampshire (west)

Demographics

At the 2000 census, there were 28,112 people, 10,402 households and 7,603 families residing in the town. The population density was 1,138.0 per square mile (439.4/km). There were 10,866 housing units at an average density of 439.9 per square mile (169.9/km). The racial makeup of the town was 95.01% White, 0.55% African American, 0.21% Native American, 2.27% Asian, 0.06% Pacific Islander, 0.83% from other races, and 1.07% from two or more races. Hispanic or Latino of any race were 1.96% of the population.

There were 10,402 households, of which 34.3% had children under the age of 18 living with them, 60.6% were married couples living together, 8.7% had a female householder with no husband present, and 26.9% were non-families. Of all households 21.2% were made up of individuals, and 7.5% had someone living alone who was 65 years of age or older. The average household size was 2.69 and the average family size was 3.16.

Age distribution was 25.3% under the age of 18, 6.2% from 18 to 24, 31.7% from 25 to 44, 25.3% from 45 to 64, and 11.5% who were 65 years of age or older. The median age was 38 years. For every 100 females, there were 99.1 males. For every 100 females age 18 and over, there were 96.9 males.

The median household income was $58,090, and the median family income was $67,278. Males had a median income of $46,330 versus $31,031 for females. The per capita income for the town was $26,170. About 3.1% of families and 4.1% of the population were below the poverty line, including 5.1% of those under age 18 and 7.6% of those age 65 or over.

Transportation 
Four New Hampshire state routes and one Interstate Highway cross Salem.

NH 28 follows Broadway through the Salem central business district, becoming Rockingham Road in the northern part of town. It connects Salem to Windham in the north and Methuen, Massachusetts, in the south.
NH 38 begins in Salem at NH 28 (Broadway) just to the east of the Mall at Rockingham Park, and goes southwest into the town of Pelham. It primarily follows Lowell Road and Rockingham Park Boulevard.
NH 97 begins in Salem at NH 28 (Broadway) and follows Main Street east to connect Salem to Haverhill, Massachusetts.
NH 111 crosses the extreme northern part of the town, connecting to Windham in the west and Hampstead in the east.
Interstate 93 crosses the town from southeast to northwest. There are two interchanges in Salem: Exit 1, which provides access to Rockingham Park Boulevard, and Exit 2, which provides access to Pelham Road.

The nearest airport is Manchester–Boston Regional Airport along the border of Londonderry and Manchester. The nearest rail service is the Haverhill Line of the MBTA Commuter Rail which can be accessed at Lawrence station in Lawrence, Massachusetts. The nearest Amtrak station is at Haverhill station in Haverhill, Massachusetts.

Education 
Salem public schools spend $5,544 per student. The average school expenditure in the U.S. is $5,678. There are about 16.1 students per teacher in Salem.

Colleges
 Southern New Hampshire University (Salem satellite campus)

High school
 Salem High School

Administration
 Salem School District

Private school
 Saint Joseph Regional Catholic School

Salem in popular culture 
Rockingham Park racetrack was located in Salem. As mentioned in the film The Sting starring Paul Newman and Robert Redford, it was central to that film's plot.

Scenes from the original The Thomas Crown Affair were filmed at the Salem glider airport, which is now Campbell's Scottish Highlands Golf Course.

Notable people 

 Artosis (born 1983), born Daniel Stemkoski, StarCraft eSports commentator
 Pamela Gidley (1965–2018), actress and model
 Katie King-Crowley (born 1975), former US Women's Ice Hockey Olympian, three-time medalist; current head coach of Boston College Eagles women's ice hockey
 Duffy Lewis (1888–1979), Major League Baseball player
 Chuck Morse (born 1960), President of the NH State Senate
 Chris Sununu (born 1974), 82nd governor of New Hampshire
 John E. Sununu (born 1964), US congressman and senator; son of John H. Sununu
 John H. Sununu (born 1939), 75th governor of New Hampshire and White House Chief of Staff under George H. W. Bush

Points of interest 
 America's Stonehenge
 Canobie Lake Park
 Tuscan Village, the former site of Rockingham Park
 Mall at Rockingham Park
 
 Manchester and Lawrence Railroad rail trail

References

External links
 
 Kelley Library
 New Hampshire Economic and Labor Market Information Bureau Profile
 Salem School District

 
Towns in Rockingham County, New Hampshire
Towns in New Hampshire
Populated places established in 1652
1652 establishments in the Thirteen Colonies